Cuntis is a municipality of Galicia, Spain in the province of Pontevedra.

References

Municipalities in the Province of Pontevedra